The Beautiful Beast is a Canadian drama film, directed by Karim Hussain and released in 2006. An adaptation of Marie-Claire Blais's 1959 novel Mad Shadows (La Belle bête), the film centres on a dysfunctional family headed by single mother Louise (Carole Laure), who has an abusive relationship with her children Patrice (Marc-André Grondin) and Isabelle-Marie (Caroline Dhavernas).

The cast also includes David La Haye, Sébastien Huberdeau, Ludivine Reding, Normand Lévesque, Nicolas Girard Deltruc and Richard Tassé.

The film premiered on October 11, 2006 at the Sitges Film Festival, before going into general release in Quebec on November 3.

Patrick Watson and Dhavernas received a Genie Award nomination for Best Original Song at the 27th Genie Awards in 2007, for the song "Trace-moi".

References

External links

2006 films
2006 drama films
Canadian drama films
Films directed by Karim Hussain
Films based on Canadian novels
Incest in film
French-language Canadian films
2000s Canadian films